Passiflora cacao is a species of Passiflora found in São Paulo and Southern Bahia, Brazil. The plant flowers in the winter in habitat

Gallery

References

External links

cacao
Flora of Brazil
Plants described in 2012